The 17th Kansas Infantry Regiment was an infantry regiment that served in the Union Army during the American Civil War.

Service
The 17th Kansas Infantry was organized at Camp Deitzler in Leavenworth, Kansas. Only five companies mustered in on July 28, 1864, at Fort Leavenworth for 100 days under the command of Lieutenant Colonel Samuel Adams Drake.
The regiment was attached to District of North Kansas.

The 17th Kansas Infantry mustered out November 16, 1864.

Detailed service
Company A ordered to Fort Riley, Company C to Cottonwood Falls and Company D to Lawrence. Operations against Price October–November. March to relief of Mound City.

Casualties
The regiment lost a total of 4 enlisted men during service, all due to disease.

Commanders
 Lieutenant Colonel Samuel Adams Drake

See also

 List of Kansas Civil War Units
 Kansas in the Civil War

References
 Dyer, Frederick H. A Compendium of the War of the Rebellion (Des Moines, IA: Dyer Pub. Co.), 1908.
 Official Military History of Kansas Regiments During the War for the Suppression of the Great Rebellion (Leavenworth, KS: W. S. Burke), 1870.
Attribution

External links
 History of the 17th Kansas Infantry by the Museum of the Kansas National Guard

Military units and formations established in 1864
Military units and formations disestablished in 1864
Units and formations of the Union Army from Kansas
1864 establishments in Kansas